Hekmatabad may refer to:
 Hekmatabad-e Pain